Bindalsfjorden is a fjord in the southern part of Nordland county, Norway.

Location
The fjord is mostly located in the municipality of Bindal with a small part in neighboring Sømna municipality.

Geography
It then flows northwest past Bindalseidet and then southwest past the village of Holm before the mouth of the fjord by the island of Austra.

There are several large arms that branch off of the fjord, including the Ursfjorden to the north and the Kjella and Sørfjorden to the south. The innermost part of the Bindalsfjorden is known as the Tosen.

References

Bindal
Fjords of Nordland